Harry Beverley (birth registered third ¼ 1907 – 1982) was an English professional rugby league footballer who played in the 1930s and 1940s, and coached in the 1950s and 1960s.

Background
Beverley's birth was registered in Leeds, West Riding of Yorkshire, England, and he died aged 74–75.

Playing career

International honours
Harry Beverley represented British Empire while at Halifax in 1937 against France, and won caps for England while at Hunslet in 1935 against Wales, in 1936 against France, in 1937 against France, in 1938 against Wales, and France, and won caps for Great Britain while at Hunslet in 1936 against Australia (3 matches), in 1937 against Australia, and while at Halifax in 1937 against Australia (2 matches).

County Honours
Harry Beverley won caps for Yorkshire while at Halifax.

Challenge Cup Final appearances
Harry Beverley played  in Hunslet's 11-5 victory over Widnes in the 1933–34 Challenge Cup Final during the 1933–34 season at Wembley Stadium, London on Saturday 5 May 1934, played  and was captain in Halifax's 20-3 victory over Salford in the 1938–39 Challenge Cup Final during the 1938–39 season at Wembley Stadium, London on Saturday 6 May 1939, and played  in Halifax's 2-9 defeat by Leeds in the 1940–41 Challenge Cup Final during the 1940–41 season at Odsal, Bradford, in front of a crowd of 28,500.

County Cup Final appearances
Harry Beverley played left-, i.e. number 4, in the Hunslet FC's 7-13 defeat by Hull Kingston Rovers in the 1929–30 Yorkshire County Cup Final during the 1929–30 season at Headingley Rugby Stadium, Leeds on Saturday 30 November 1929, in front of a crowd of 11,000.

Honoured at Halifax
Harry Beverley is a Halifax Hall Of Fame Inductee.

References

External links

1907 births
1982 deaths
Bradford Bulls coaches
British Empire rugby league team players
England national rugby league team players
English rugby league coaches
English rugby league players
Great Britain national rugby league team players
Halifax R.L.F.C. captains
Halifax R.L.F.C. players
Hunslet F.C. (1883) players
People from Hunslet
Rugby league locks
Rugby league players from Leeds
Wakefield Trinity coaches
Yorkshire rugby league team players